Padre Aldamiz International Airport  , also known as Puerto Maldonado International Airport, is an airport serving the city of Puerto Maldonado in the Madre de Dios Region of Peru. The airport oversees a small number of domestic (national) commercial flights.

Padre Aldamiz International Airport is near some of Peru's noted ecological areas, such as the national jungle reserve of Tambopata-Candamo. Like many airports around the world, Padre Aldamiz International Airport benefits mostly from one type of traveler, in this case ecology tourists. Western doctors often warn that airport authorities require travelers to carry documentation informing about yellow fever vaccination because of its rainforest location.

The airport was served by Peru's national airline, AeroPerú. AeroPerú ceased operations in 1999, and, subsequently, other airlines have entered the Lima to Puerto Maldonado air route. Nuevo Continente made an attempt in 2004, but that airline suspended operations amid allegations of drug trafficking by their owners. It was served by LAN Perú and TACA Perú, the former continues to serve the airport as LATAM Peru.

The Peruvian Air Force flies Boeing 707 jets to Padre Aldamiz International Airport, to carry civilian cargo operations. The airport can handle landings by different types of jets. For example, LATAM Perú uses Airbus A320 family aircraft.

Airlines and destinations

Statistics

See also
Transport in Peru
List of airports in Peru

References

External links
SkyVector Aeronautical Charts
OurAirports - Puerto Maldonado

Airports in Peru
Buildings and structures in Madre de Dios Region